Tilmicosin is a macrolide antibiotic.  It is used in veterinary medicine for the treatment of bovine respiratory disease and enzootic pneumonia caused by Mannheimia (Pasteurella) haemolytica in sheep. In humans, Tilmicosin causes fatal cardiotoxic effects at amounts greater than 1 milliliter when injected, something most commonly seen in veterinary personnel and farmers.

References

Macrolide antibiotics
Veterinary drugs